is a Japanese former long jumper who competed in the 1972 Summer Olympics, where he was eliminated in the qualifying round of the men's long jump.

References

1949 births
Living people
Place of birth missing (living people)
Japanese male long jumpers
Olympic male long jumpers
Olympic athletes of Japan
Athletes (track and field) at the 1972 Summer Olympics
Asian Games silver medalists for Japan
Asian Games medalists in athletics (track and field)
Athletes (track and field) at the 1974 Asian Games
Medalists at the 1974 Asian Games